Skasenden is a village in Grue Municipality in Innlandet county, Norway. The village is located at the northern end of the lake Skasen between the villages of Kirkenær and Svullrya.

References

Grue, Norway
Villages in Innlandet